Farinella is an Italian surname. Notable people with the surname include:

 Giuseppe Farinella (1925–2017), Sicilian Mafiosi
 Paolo Farinella (1953–2000), Italian astronomer

See also
 3248 Farinella, a main-belt asteroid

Italian-language surnames